To Have & to Hold is a 2021 Philippine television drama romance series broadcast by GMA Network. Directed by Don Michael Perez, it stars Carla Abellana, Rocco Nacino and Max Collins. It premiered on September 27, 2021 on the network's Telebabad line up. The series concluded on December 17, 2021 with a total of 60 episodes.

The series is streaming online on YouTube.

Cast and characters

Lead cast
 Carla Abellana as Erica Pineda-Gatchalian
 Rocco Nacino as Gavin Ramirez
 Max Collins as Dominique "Dom" Garcia-Ramirez

Supporting cast
 Roi Vinzon as Giovanni Ramirez
 Ina Feleo as Raquel "Quel" Asuncion
 Valeen Montenegro as Sofia Carlos
 Bing Pimentel as Carmelita "Millet" Ramirez
 Gilleth Sandico as Victoria "Vicky" Pineda
 Luis Hontiveros as Daryl Manabal
 Athenah Madrid as Grace "Gracie" Ramirez-Manabal

Guest cast
 Rafael Rosell as Timothy "Tony" Gatchalian
 Dion Ignacio as Ian Lobangco
 JC Tan as Jeremy Fabregas
 Kevin Sagra as Jessie
 Gerick Manalo as Dino

Production
Actor Derek Ramsay was initially hired to appear in the series as Gavin Ramirez. In May 2021, Ramsay was replaced by Rocco Nacino. Principal photography commenced in May 2021. It was halted in August 2021 due to the community quarantine imposed in the National Capital Region in response to the COVID-19 pandemic.

Ratings
According to AGB Nielsen Philippines' Nationwide Urban Television Audience Measurement People in television homes, the pilot episode of To Have & to Hold earned a 9.5% rating.

References

External links
 
 

2021 Philippine television series debuts
2021 Philippine television series endings
Filipino-language television shows
GMA Network drama series
Philippine romance television series
Television productions postponed due to the COVID-19 pandemic
Television shows set in the Philippines